Simon C. Crosse (21 May 1930 – 14 January 2021) was a British rower. He competed in the men's coxed four event at the 1960 Summer Olympics. He represented England and won a gold medal in the coxed four at the 1958 British Empire and Commonwealth Games in Cardiff, Wales.

References

External links
 

1930 births
2021 deaths
British male rowers
Olympic rowers of Great Britain
Rowers at the 1960 Summer Olympics
People from Christchurch, Dorset
Sportspeople from Dorset
Commonwealth Games medallists in rowing
Rowers at the 1958 British Empire and Commonwealth Games
Commonwealth Games gold medallists for England
Medallists at the 1958 British Empire and Commonwealth Games